The British Railways Standard Class 9F 2-10-0 is a class of steam locomotive designed for British Railways by Robert Riddles. The Class 9F was the last in a series of standardised locomotive classes designed for British Railways during the 1950s, and was intended for use on fast, heavy freight trains over long distances.  It was one of the most powerful steam locomotive types ever built for British Railways, and successfully performed its intended duties. The class was given the nickname of 'Spaceships', due to its size and shape.

At various times during the 1950s, the 9Fs worked passenger trains with great success, indicating the versatility of the design, sometimes considered to represent the ultimate in British steam development. Several experimental variants were constructed in an effort to reduce costs and maintenance, although these met with varying degrees of success. They were capable of reaching speeds of up to 90 miles per hour (145 km/h).

The total number built was 251, production being shared between Swindon (53) and Crewe Works (198). The last of the class, 92220 Evening Star, was the final steam locomotive to be built by British Railways, in 1960. Withdrawals of the class began in 1964, with the final locomotives being withdrawn from service in 1968, the final year of steam traction on British Railways. Nine examples have survived into the preservation era in varying states of repair, including Evening Star.

They were generally thought of as very successful locomotives, O. S. Nock stating "The '9F' was unquestionably the most distinctive and original of all the British standard steam locomotives, and with little doubt the most successful. They were remarkable in their astonishing capacity for speed as well as their work in heavy freight haulage."

Background
The British Transport Commission had proposed that the existing steam locomotive fleet be replaced by both diesel and electric traction. However the board of British Railways, which wanted the railways to be completely electrified, ignored the BTC and ordered a new fleet of 'standard' steam locomotive designs as an interim motive power solution ahead of electrification. Freight was well catered for in terms of locomotive availability after nationalisation in 1948, with a number of heavy freight locomotives built to aid the war effort forming part of British Railways' inheritance. This consisted of 666 LMS 8F Class 2-8-0 and numerous Robert Riddles designed WD Austerity 2-8-0s and WD Austerity 2-10-0s.

It was the Eastern Region's Motive Power officer, L.P. Parker, who made the case for a new design of powerful freight locomotive, able to shift heavy loads at fast speeds in round trips between distant destinations within the eight-hour shift of the footplate crew. Riddles took up the challenge, initially designing a 2-8-2 locomotive, but settled upon the 2-10-0 wheel arrangement for the increased traction and lower axle load that five coupled axles can provide. The resultant design became one of the most successful, but shortest-lived, locomotive classes ever built in Britain.

Design features
The 9F was designed at both Derby and Brighton Works in 1951 to operate freight trains of up to 900 tons (914 tonnes) at 35 mph (56 km/h) with maximum fuel efficiency. The original proposal was for a boiler from the BR Standard Class 7 Britannia 4-6-2, adapting it to a 2-8-2 wheel arrangement  but Riddles eventually settled upon a 2-10-0 type because it had been used successfully on some of his previous Austerity locomotives. Distributing the adhesive weight over five axles gave a maximum axle load of only 15 tons, 10 cwt. However, in order to clear the rear coupled wheels, the grate had to be set higher, thus reducing firebox volume. There were many problems associated with locomotives of such a long wheelbase, but these were solved by the design team through a series of compromises. The centre driving wheels had no flanges, and those on the second and fourth coupled wheels were reduced in depth. This enabled the locomotive to round curves of only  radius.

Construction history
Introduced in January 1954, the class comprised 251 locomotives, of which 53 were constructed at Swindon Works, and 198 at Crewe Works. The locomotives were numbered 92000-92250. The last member of the class was constructed at Swindon in 1960, the 999th "BR Standard" to be constructed, and the last steam locomotive to be built by British Railways. To mark the occasion, a competition was run within the Western Region of British Railways to choose an apt name, and the locomotive was given the name and number of 92220 Evening Star. Many of the class lasted only a few years in service before withdrawal when steam traction ended on the mainline in Britain. Withdrawals of the class from everyday service began in May 1964, and had been completed by June 1968.

Variations
The 9F was used as a proving ground for a variety of technical innovations intended to provide improvements in efficiency, power or cost.

Franco-Crosti boiler

Ten locomotives (numbers 92020-92029) were built in 1955 with the Franco-Crosti boiler. which incorporated a combustion gas feed water preheater that recuperated low-grade residual heat. In the 9F version, this took the form of a single cylindrical water drum running along the underside of the main boiler barrel. The standard chimney on top of the smokebox was only used during lighting up. In normal working the gases went through firetubes inside the preheater drum that led to a second smokebox situated beneath the boiler from which there emerged a chimney on the right-hand side, just forward of the firebox. In the event, the experiment did not deliver the hoped-for benefits, and efficiency was not increased sufficiently to justify the cost and complexity. Moreover, conditions were unpleasant on the footplate in a cross-wind, this in spite of the later provision of a small deflector plate forward of the chimney. These problems led to the subsequent removal of the preheater drum, although the locomotives did retain the original main smokebox with its distinctive look.

Westinghouse Pump Variation
The ten 9F locomotives (92060-92066 and 92097–92099) allocated to Tyne Dock on the NER were fitted with Westinghouse Pumps to drive the pneumatic doors on the 56 ton ore hopper wagons which operated on the heavily inclined Consett line to the Consett Iron Company. These additional pumps allowed automatic discharging of the ore train, consisting of nine hoppers, in under a minute at Consett.

Mechanical stoker and blastpipe variation
Locomotive numbers 92165–92167 were built with a mechanical stoker, which was a helical screw that conveyed coal from the tender to the firebox, where it would be directed to the required part of the grate by high-pressure steam jets controlled by the fireman. The stoker made higher steaming rates possible, and it was hoped that mechanical stoking might enable the burning of low-grade coal. It was relatively inefficient, and the locomotives used in this trial were rebuilt to the normal configuration. Simply supplying more low grade coal than a fireman could do by hand did not provide efficient burning. Trials found that the maximum coal delivery rate of the mechanical stoker was slightly faster than firing by hand, and it could maintain that maximum for hours at a time when a fireman would tire. However, that was of little practical benefit in actual service, because even a long-distance freight train would frequently stop to allow faster trains to pass or would be held at signals. For the short periods when maximum firing rate was needed, a skilled fireman was more than sufficient. The success of mechanical stokers on North American railroads was mainly because the locomotives were significantly larger (with a commensurately greater demand for coal) and many routes required hours of supplying coal at a rate beyond the physical limit of a single fireman.

Number 92250 was equipped with a Giesl ejector, which divided the exhaust steam between seven nozzles arranged in a row on the locomotive's longitudinal axis, and directed into a narrow fan-shaped ejector that more intimately mixed it with the smokebox gases than is the case of an ordinary chimney. That offered the same level of draught for a reduced level of exhaust back-pressure or, alternatively, increased draught with no performance loss elsewhere. Again, claims were made about the potential benefits, and 92250 retained the variant chimney until withdrawal, although no benefit was noticeable.

The only modification which did deliver any noticeable benefit was the fitting of 92178 with a double blastpipe and chimney during its construction. Following delivery in September 1957, it was subjected to extensive testing, both in the Rugby Locomotive Testing Station and on service trains. After the completion of the tests in February 1958, it was decided to fit all 9Fs built subsequently with double blastpipes and chimneys — they were numbers 92183 onwards, as well as 92165–7. The modification was also installed on 92000/1/2/5 and 92006. That allowed the engines to steam slightly more freely and thus generate higher power ranges.

Operational details

The 9F turned out to be the best of the Standard classes, and one of the finest steam locomotives ever designed in Britain in terms of its capacity to haul heavy loads over long distances. It was highly effective at its designed purpose, hauling heavy, fast freight trains, and was used all over the British railway network. This was exemplified when in September 1982, preserved engine 92203 Black Prince set the record for the heaviest train ever hauled by a steam locomotive in Britain, when it started a 2,178-ton train at a Foster Yeoman quarry in Somerset, UK.

The 9F also proved its worth as a passenger locomotive, adept at fast running despite its small driving wheels, and for a time was a frequent sight on the Somerset and Dorset Railway, where its power and high proportion of adhesive weight were well suited to coping with the 1 in 50 ruling gradient on the Bath extension. On one occasion, a 9F was set to haul an express passenger train, in place of the normal LNER pacific, from Grantham to King's Cross. An enthusiast aboard the train timed the run and noted that twice the speed exceeded 90 mph. The driver was afterwards told that he was only supposed to keep time, "not break the bloody sound barrier!". He replied that the engine had no speedometer, and that it ran so smoothly at high speeds that he just let it run as fast as felt safe. Nor was this the only instance of 9Fs reaching high speeds. However, concerns that the high rotational speeds involved in fast running could cause excessive wear and tear to the plain-bearing running gear prompted the British Railways management to stop using 9Fs on express passenger trains.

In 1960, 9Fs from the Western Region's Cardiff Canton shed (code 86C) were also regularly made ready as 'standby' locomotives - in case of failure of the more usual Britannias - on the region's flagship Paddington-Cardiff/Swansea passenger express trains, the Red Dragon and Capitals United Express. Locomotives used on these duties included No. 92220 Evening Star, the only 9F to be given a name and to be painted in the express passenger livery of lined Brunswick green. On 8 September 1962 No. 92220 also hauled the last Pines Express to use the Somerset and Dorset route.

Like other primarily goods locomotives, British Railways' fleet of 9Fs also saw extensive passenger service in hauling Saturday 'Holiday Specials', especially in the North East and Western regions.

Accidents and incidents
On 19 November 1958, locomotive No. 92187 was hauling a freight train which overran signals and was in a rear-end collision with another at Hitchin, Hertfordshire. A third freight train ran into the wreckage.
On 7 April 1964, locomotive No. 92161 was hauling a freight train that was derailed at Howe & Co's Signalbox, Cumberland due to a combination of defects on a wagon, excessive speed and minor track defects.

Livery and numbering

The class were painted British Railways Freight Black without lining. The British Railways crest was located on the tender side. Given the British Railways power classification 9F, the locomotives were numbered in the 92xxx series, between 92000 and 92250. Because of its status as the last steam locomotive constructed at Swindon, No. 92220 was named Evening Star and turned out in British Railways Brunswick Green livery, which was usually reserved for express passenger locomotives. Several locomotives allocated to the Western Region, including no. 92220, bore a blue spot on the cab side below the number, to denote the axle loading under the former GWR's system of weight classification.

Preservation

Nine 9F locomotives survived withdrawal from mainline service into preservation: Evening Star became part of the National Collection; eight others were bought directly from BR or from Woodham Brothers scrapyard in Barry, South Wales. Only six members of the class have been restored to running order. 92240 was the first of the class to steam in preservation after restoration work in 1990. Engines from both builders have survived with three Crewe-built engines and six Swindon-built engines. The majority of the class have double chimneys but 92134 is fitted with a single chimney.

† In most cases, names are not historically accurate; i.e. they have all been applied in preservation except 92220 which, being the last steam locomotive to be built for BR, was named Evening Star during its unveiling in 1960. Some locomotives may also have names, but marked names indicate that the locomotive is not presently wearing them.

Of the nine surviving members of the class, two have run on the main line: nos. 92203 Black Prince & 92220 Evening Star. Due to the engines' flangeless centre driving wheels, there is a concern that the raised check rails on modern pointwork might cause a derailment, so the class (alongside other 2-10-0 locomotives) is currently prohibited from operating on the main line – including the Esk Valley Line from Battersby to Whitby, used by the North Yorkshire Moors Railway on their Grosmont to Whitby trains alongside the regular passenger services on the route.

Models

OO scale
The erstwhile Kitmaster company produced an unpowered polystyrene injection moulded model kit for scale. In late 1962, the Kitmaster brand was sold by its parent company (Rosebud Dolls) to Airfix, which transferred the moulding tools to their own factory; the 9F class was among the re-introduced former Kitmaster range. In time, the moulding tools passed on to Dapol, which also produced the kit. During the 1960s a cast white metal chassis kit in the Simplas range to motorise the model was made available by Wilro Models of Hackney, London.

In late 1971, Tri-ang Hornby introduced a 00 scale Ready to Run model of this locomotive; it continued to be produced after the rebranding as Hornby Railways.

Currently both Hornby and Bachmann produce models of this class in OO scale, with the cheaper, less detailed Hornby version being part of the budget "Railroad" range. Hornby also released a model of the Thomas & Friends character Murdoch in December 2011. In August 2015, a Franco-Crosti boilered variant was introduced into the Hornby RailRoad range. The Bachmann model covers most variations of the class.

When announcing an all-new 9F model in their 2021 range, Hornby stated that it would be able to recreate almost all detail variations within the class of 251 locomotives, including locomotives fitted with mechanical stokers and those fitted with Westinghouse brake equipment for working the heavy Consett iron ore trains.

N scale
In the 1980s Minitrix produced two Ready to Run N scale models of the class. In 2009 Dapol were commissioned to produce an N scale Ready to Run model of 92203 by TMC.

Other
The last design by model engineer Curly Lawrence ("LBSC") was for a live steam 3½ inch gauge model BR 9F Locomotive. The design was unfinished by the time of his death on 4 November 1967. The design was subsequently completed by Martin Evans.

In fiction
Murdoch from Thomas & Friends is a BR Standard Class 9F locomotive.

Footnotes

References

Further reading

External links 

 Class BR9F Details at Rail UK

 
9F
2-10-0 locomotives
Railway locomotives introduced in 1954
Freight locomotives
1′E h2 locomotives
Standard gauge steam locomotives of Great Britain